Dmytro Bashlay (born 25 April 1990) is a Ukrainian professional footballer who plays as a centre-back for Radunia Stężyca.

Career
Bashlay is a product of different youth sport school systems in Kyiv. After playing 7 years for FC Naftovyk-Ukrnafta in the Ukrainian First League, he played in Kazakhstan.

He has the older brother, Andriy Bashlay, who also is a professional footballer.

In February 2019, Bashlay moved to Arsenal Kyiv on a free transfer. He made his league debut for the club on 24 February 2019 in a 2-0 home defeat to FC Desna.

References

External links 
 
 

1990 births
Living people
Footballers from Kyiv
Ukrainian footballers
Ukrainian expatriate footballers
Association football midfielders
FC Olimpik Donetsk players
FC Naftovyk-Ukrnafta Okhtyrka players
FC Obolon-Brovar Kyiv players
FC Taraz players
FC Dnepr Mogilev players
FC Poltava players
SC Dnipro-1 players
FC Arsenal Kyiv players
Podbeskidzie Bielsko-Biała players
Ukrainian Premier League players
Ukrainian First League players
Kazakhstan Premier League players
Belarusian Premier League players
Ekstraklasa players
I liga players
II liga players
Ukrainian expatriate sportspeople in Poland
Ukrainian expatriate sportspeople in Belarus
Ukrainian expatriate sportspeople in Kazakhstan
Expatriate footballers in Poland
Expatriate footballers in Belarus
Expatriate footballers in Kazakhstan